A Busy Night is a 2016 Chinese comedy film directed by Wang Li. It was released in China by Wuzhou Film Distribution and Huaxia Film Distribution on July 29, 2016.

Plot

Cast
Li Jing
Cao Yunjin
Ma Li
Cica Zhou
Lam Suet
Joy Sheng
Paul Chun

Reception
The film grossed  at the Chinese box office.

References

Chinese comedy films
2016 comedy films
Wuzhou Film Distribution films
Huaxia Film Distribution films